Feistmantl or Feistmantel is a German surname. Notable people with the surname include: 

Josef Feistmantl (1939–2019), Austrian luger
Karl Feistmantl, Austrian luger
Otokar Feistmantel (1848-1891), Czech-Austrian geologist and paleontologist

See also
Feistmantel Valley, fossiliferous valley in Antarctica, named after Otokar Feistmantel

German-language surnames